Careful, He Might Hear You is a Miles Franklin Award-winning novel by Australian author Sumner Locke Elliott.  It was published in 1963.

The 1983 film Careful, He Might Hear You was based on the novel.

Synopsis
Careful, He Might Hear You is based on the author's childhood.  The secure world of an orphan living with his working-class aunt and uncle is changed forever with the arrival of another aunt from London who wishes to raise him as her child.

Adaptions
Along with the 1983 film, a Musical production was performed in Canberra, Australia in 1999 by Supa Productions. The stage production was developed by David Sale (Book and Lyrics) and Ron Creager (music) and starred Toni Lamond (as Lila Baines), Jayden Cooke and Jordan Prosser (as PS) and Bronwyn Sullivan (as Vanessa Scott).

References
Elliott, Sumner Locke.  "Careful, He Might Hear You".  1963, Houston.  (ISBN, 1921922249, 9781921922244)
Middlemiss.org

1963 Australian novels
1963 American novels
Miles Franklin Award-winning works
Novels by Sumner Locke Elliott
Harper & Row books
Novels about orphans
American novels adapted into films